The Wilsonville railroad bridge is a steel truss bridge that crosses the Willamette River at Wilsonville, Oregon, United States. The original bridge was built to carry the Oregon Electric Railway across the river near the Boones Ferry.

History
The first bridge was built in 1907 for the Oregon Electric Railway line that ran from Eugene to Portland. This trestle caught fire in July 1939.

In 1954, the ferry was discontinued when the Boone Bridge opened to carry U.S. Route 99, now Interstate 5. Ownership of the rail bridge passed to the Spokane, Portland and Seattle Railway in 1910, and in 1970 it became part of the new Burlington Northern Railroad (BN).

In 1972, initial plans for a new bridge were approved by the Coast Guard and construction began on August 1, 1973. Hensel Phelps Construction Company built the new bridge for Burlington Northern, which included constructing new piers in the river. The bridge was completed in July 1975, and opened for rail traffic on August 6, 1975. The rail line was leased to Portland and Western in 1995, which they then bought the tracks in 1997. The land and bridges underneath the tracks of the line were donated to the state by Burlington Northern in 1998.

Details
Located upstream from the old ferry landings, the bridge is at river mile 38.8. This type of truss allowed the new bridge to sit lower than the previous bridge, as the bridge's structure sat above the tracks, whereas the old bridge's girders were located below the track level, and thus the entire bridge needed to be higher in order to allow river traffic to pass.

The structure is supported by four concrete piers in the river, three piers on land, and two abutments. Carrying a single track on a concrete deck, the bridge includes six  deck girder spans used on the approaches. The black-colored bridge was designed and built by Hensel Phelps Construction. Constructed of weathering steel, the bridge superstructure is oxidized, which prevents rust. It also means the bridge does not need to be painted.

References

External links
 Picture of original bridge
 Steamboat passing the original bridge
 Structurae
 Picture of construction on the original bridge

Buildings and structures in Wilsonville, Oregon
Bridges completed in 1975
Bridges in Clackamas County, Oregon
Bridges over the Willamette River
Railroad bridges in Oregon
1975 establishments in Oregon
Transportation in Wilsonville, Oregon
Steel bridges in the United States
Truss bridges in the United States